The Movement of Trique Unification and Struggle is one of the oldest and strongest left wing organizations in the state of Oaxaca, in Mexico. MULT works with indigenous people around  Oaxaca.

The Movement of Trique Unification and Struggle developed closer ties with EZLN from Chiapas.

Oaxaca